Los Extraterrestres World Tour is the third world by the reggaeton duo Wisin & Yandel to support their fifth studio album Wisin vs. Yandel: Los Extraterrestres. This tour included their first official arena tour in The United States and their first presentation as headliners in Mexico, Paraguay and Argentina. During the tour the album was re-released and for this reason some concerts were renamed under the title Los Extraterestres: Otra Dimension.

Overview 
In the original plans, the tour was expected to end in December in Bolivia and afterwards the tour was expected to start another tour in relation to their 10th anniversary in music in early 2009. However, the concerts in Bolivia were pushed back to January 2009 and those plans were scrapped.

The tour contained their first arena tour in the United States. The concert in Los Angeles set a record in attendance by a Hispanic act at the Staples Center. The New York Times gave a positive review to their concert at New York's Madison Square Garden and titled the article "Two Romeos Romance the World to an Adrenalized Reggaetón Beat". Also, it was reported that the concert was sold out.

The duo closed the Viña 2008 Internacional Festival, becoming just the third reggaeton act to perform at the festival. In Mexico, they performed at the National Auditorium, becoming the first reggaeton act to do so. Around 10,000 fans showed up to their concert in Lima.

Tour dates

Notes

Box office data

Cancelled concerts

References 

Concert tours
Reggaeton articles
Latin music